Nucleoporin 88 (Nup88) is a protein that in humans is encoded by the NUP88 gene.

Function 

The nuclear pore complex is a massive structure that extends across the nuclear envelope, forming a gateway that regulates the flow of macromolecules between the nucleus and the cytoplasm. Nucleoporins, a family of 50 to 100 proteins, are the main components of the nuclear pore complex in eukaryotic cells. The protein encoded by this gene belongs to the nucleoporin family and is associated with the oncogenic nucleoporin CAN/Nup214 in a dynamic subcomplex. This protein is also overexpressed in a large number of malignant neoplasms and precancerous dysplasias.

Interactions 

NUP88 has been shown to interact with NUP98.

References

Further reading 

 
 
 
 
 
 
 
 
 
 
 
 
 
 
 

Nuclear pore complex